Bonkuiyeh (also Romanized as Bonkū’īyeh; also known as Bon Kūh) is a village in Lalehzar Rural District, Lalehzar District, Bardsir County, Kerman Province, Iran. At the 2006 census, its population was 96, in 18 families.

References 

Populated places in Bardsir County